Heflin is a surname. Notable people with the surname include:

Donald Heflin (born 1958), American diplomat and ambassador
Frances Heflin (1920–1994), American actress
Howell Heflin (1921–2005), American politician
Jack Heflin (born 1998), American football player
James Thomas Heflin (1869–1951), American politician
Van Heflin (1910–1971), American actor
Victor Heflin (born 1960), American football player